Brit Awards 1988  was the 8th edition of the Brit Awards, an annual pop music awards ceremony in the United Kingdom. It was organised by the British Phonographic Industry and took place on 8 February 1988 at Royal Albert Hall in London. This year marked the first presentation of the now-defunct International Breakthrough Act award.

The awards ceremony, hosted by Noel Edmonds, was televised by the BBC.

Performances
 Bananarama – "Love in the First Degree"
 Bee Gees – "You Win Again"
 Chris Rea – "Let's Dance"
 Pet Shop Boys with Dusty Springfield – "What Have I Done to Deserve This?"
 Rick Astley – "Never Gonna Give You Up"
 Terence Trent D'Arby – "Wishing Well"
 T'Pau – "China in Your Hand"
 The Who – "My Generation" / "Who Are You"

Winners and nominees

Multiple nominations and awards
The following artists received multiple awards and/or nominations.

References

External links
Brit Awards 1988 at Brits.co.uk

Brit Awards
Brit Awards
BRIT Awards
BRIT Awards
Brit Awards
Brit Awards